Willow Grove Park was an amusement park located in Willow Grove, Pennsylvania (the part which is in Abington Township), United States, that operated for eighty years from 1896 until the 1975 season.  It was generally an alternative to the Woodside Amusement Park in Fairmount Park until its closure.  The park operated under the name Six Gun Territory from 1972. After closure, announced in April 1976, the park sat vacant until the land was cleared for a large shopping mall known as Willow Grove Park Mall, which opened in August 1982. The mall pays homage to its predecessor by displaying banners and other objects which hark back to the land's days as an amusement park; a merry-go-round built and installed in 2001 operates within the mall.

The park originally was conceived by one of the three Philadelphia area traction companies, the Peoples Traction Company, as a means to encourage weekend customers on the trolley line, a practice that led to the coining of the term trolley park. Willow Grove was one of the premier amusement parks in the United States for a long time, until it was eclipsed by the openings of Disneyland and other more modern theme parks beginning in the 1950s.

The park was served by the Philadelphia Rapid Transit Co. (PRT) and later Philadelphia Transportation Company (PTC) Route 6 streetcar line. In its most recent configuration, Route 6 began at the Olney Terminal of the Broad Street subway, principally traversing Ogontz Avenue in the city, crossing the city line at Cheltenham Avenue, and then proceeding on private right-of-way near Limekiln Pike, street running on Keswick Avenue in Glenside, and then mostly side-of-the-road private right-of-way until reaching the park. The line was fully double-tracked. Streetcar service to the park ended in 1958 when the Pennsylvania Highway Department (predecessor to the Pennsylvania Department of Transportation) acquired portions of the private right-of-way near Limekiln Pike for construction of the Pennsylvania Route 309 Expressway. President's Conference Committee (PCC) design streetcars were used on Route 6 beginning in the 1940s. After the loss of trackage for the Route 309 Expressway, Route 6 was cut back to a loop and terminus at Cheltenham and Ogontz Avenues at the city line. Starting in September 1968, Route 6 streetcar service was operated by the Southeastern Pennsylvania Transportation Authority (SEPTA) until rail service was permanently replaced by bus in 1986.

One of the biggest attractions in the park was the music pavilion, at which John Philip Sousa and his band played every year, but one, between 1901 and 1926. The pavilion was demolished in March 1959.

A documentary of the park was created in 1991 titled Life was a Lark at Willow Grove Park [NTSC / 1991 / 50 MINS]. The title is based on the popular park slogan "Life is a lark at Willow Grove Park".

A book from Arcadia Publishing entitled Willow Grove Park (2005) includes over 200 photos of the park and is the only comprehensive history of the park. The thoroughly researched book also corrects many of the historical inaccuracies that have grown up surrounding the history of the park.

In popular culture
In 1973 near the end of the park's operations, the grounds were used as sets for the cult classic film Malatesta's Carnival of Blood.

James A. Michener wrote a novel entitled The Fires of Spring, telling the story of a young orphan boy named David Harper growing up in a poorhouse in Doylestown, Bucks County, Pennsylvania, which is near Willow Grove. Harper works at an amusement park named Paradise which is loosely based on Michener's own experiences as a young man when he worked at Willow Grove Park.

In American Dreams, season one, episode three “New Frontier”, Willow Grove was mentioned along with one of its rollercoasters, by Helen Pryor to Will at the end of the episode.

The park is referred to by Claudette Colbert in the 1934 film She Married Her Boss.

Bill Cosby wrote and performed a stand-up routine called "Roland and the Roller Coaster," describing his childhood ride on the roller coaster at Willow Grove Park.

The carnival scenes for Abbott and Costello's final film together, Dance With Me, Henry were filmed at the park.

References

External links

 Upper Moreland Historical Association - History of Willow Grove Park
 A Synopsis of Moreland Township and Willow Grove, by Joe Thomas, Upper Moreland Historical Association
 The John MacCarley collection of Willow Grove Park concert programs, containing concert programs from 1904 to 1925, are available for research use at the Historical Society of Pennsylvania.

Amusement parks in Pennsylvania
1896 establishments in Pennsylvania
1975 disestablishments in Pennsylvania
Defunct amusement parks in Pennsylvania
Amusement parks opened in 1896
Amusement parks closed in 1976